Victor "Vic" Nurenberg (22 November 1930 – 22 April 2010) was a Luxembourg professional footballer. Nurenberg played in France for 13 seasons, representing four clubs. He also represented the Luxembourg national football team.

Club career
Born in Niederkorn, Nurenberg started his career at local team Progrès Niedercorn aged 16 while he was working at a local factory and moved abroad to play for 13 years in France with OGC Nice, FC Sochaux, Olympique Lyonnais and SC Bastia.

With Nice he won the French league title three times and the domestic cup twice. He scored in both cup final wins. His moment of fame came in February 1960 when he scored a hat-trick for Nice in the UEFA Champions Cup quarter finals against Real Madrid, who would later lift the cup for a 5th successive time.

He returned to Luxembourg in 1964 to become player/coach at Spora Luxembourg and won the domestic cup with them twice.

International career
Nurenberg made his debut for Luxembourg in 1951 against Belgium B and went on to earn 16 caps, including non-official matches. He played in three FIFA World Cup qualification matches and 2 games at the 1952 Olympic Games.

He played his final international game in September 1964 against Yugoslavia.

Personal life and death
After retiring from football, Nurenberg worked at a casino in Nice and later opened a bar there. He lived in Saint-Laurent-du-Var, a Nice suburb, with his wife of over 50 years, Paulette Pieri. In 2008, he was promoted to the rank of Chevalier in the Order of Merit of the Grand Duchy of Luxembourg. He died on 22 April 2010, aged 79.

Honours
Nice
 French League: 1952, 1956, 1959
 French Cup: 1952, 1954

Spora Luxembourg
 Luxembourg Cup: 1965, 1966

References

External links
 Bio - Profootball
 Profile - Association Luxembourgeois des Olympiens
 Profile - Sports-reference.com

1930 births
2010 deaths
Association football forwards
Luxembourgian footballers
Luxembourg international footballers
Luxembourgian expatriate footballers
Olympic footballers of Luxembourg
Footballers at the 1952 Summer Olympics
OGC Nice players
FC Sochaux-Montbéliard players
Olympique Lyonnais players
SC Bastia players
Ligue 1 players
Ligue 2 players
Expatriate footballers in France
Luxembourgian expatriate sportspeople in France
Knights of the Order of Merit of the Grand Duchy of Luxembourg